Hans Bütikofer (July 29, 1915 – January 12, 2011) was a Swiss bobsledder who competed in the late 1930s. He won the silver medal in the four-man event at the 1936 Winter Olympics in Garmisch-Partenkirchen, Germany.

References
Bobsleigh four-man Olympic medalists for 1924, 1932-56, and since 1964
DatabaseOlympics.com profile
Hans Bütikofer's obituary 

1915 births
2011 deaths
Bobsledders at the 1936 Winter Olympics
Swiss male bobsledders
Olympic medalists in bobsleigh
Medalists at the 1936 Winter Olympics
Olympic silver medalists for Switzerland
20th-century Swiss people